In enzymology, a p-benzoquinone reductase (NADPH) is an enzyme that catalyzes the chemical reaction

NADPH + H+ + p-benzoquinone  NADP+ + hydroquinone

The 3 substrates of this enzyme are NADPH, H+, and p-benzoquinone, whereas its two products are NADP+ and hydroquinone.

This enzyme belongs to the family of oxidoreductases, specifically those acting on NADH or NADPH with a quinone or similar compound as acceptor.  The systematic name of this enzyme class is NADPH:p-benzoquinone oxidoreductase. This enzyme participates in gamma-hexachlorocyclohexane degradation.

References

 

EC 1.6.5
NADPH-dependent enzymes
Enzymes of unknown structure